General William Gustavus Brown (3 February 1809 – 27 November 1883) was Commander of British Troops in China and Hong Kong.

Family
Brown was born in Kingston, Jamaica, to Janette Smellie (who was listed as a free woman of colour on his baptism) and Major Gustav Heinrich Gottlieb Braun (Brown), a German-born officer in the King's Royal Rifle Corps.

Military career
Brown was commissioned into the 24th Regiment of Foot. Having served as a brigadier-general at Aldershot, he was promoted to major-general and made commander of British Troops in China and Hong Kong in 1863. During his term in command he put down a disturbance at Taitsan; allegations were made at the time about cruelty by British troops but were subsequently dismissed as groundless.

He was also colonel of the 83rd (County of Dublin) Regiment of Foot.

In retirement, he lived in Sydenham in Kent.

References

1809 births
1883 deaths
British Army generals
South Wales Borderers officers
English people of German descent
Migrants from British Jamaica to the United Kingdom
British people in British Hong Kong
People from Kingston, Jamaica
People from Sydenham, London
19th-century Jamaican people
Free people of color